2016 Matsumoto Yamaga FC season.

J2 League

References

External links
 J.League official site

Matsumoto Yamaga FC
Matsumoto Yamaga FC seasons